Ali-Breeze King (born 6 February 1977) is an Australian politician. She has been the Labor Party member for Pumicestone in the Queensland Legislative Assembly since 2020.

She stood as a Labor candidate for the seat of Maiwar in the 2017 Queensland state election, but was unsuccessful.

Prior to her election King was mentored by Victorian MP Sonya Kilkenny through EMILY's List.

References

1977 births
Living people
Members of the Queensland Legislative Assembly
Australian Labor Party members of the Parliament of Queensland
21st-century Australian politicians
Women members of the Queensland Legislative Assembly
21st-century Australian women politicians